Palikoppa is a village in Dharwad district of Karnataka, India.

Demographics 
As of the 2011 Census of India there were 197 households in Palikoppa and a total population of 1,014 consisting of 520 males and 494 females. There were 105 children ages 0-6.

Assembly constituency  : Kundgol assembly constituency
Lok Sabha constituency : Dharwad parliamentary constituency

References

Villages in Dharwad district